Allen Trimble (November 24, 1783 – February 3, 1870) was a Federalist and National Republican politician from Ohio. Son of James Trimble and Jane Allen.  He served as the eighth and tenth governor of Ohio, first concurrently as Senate Speaker, later elected twice in his own right.

Biography
Governor Trimble was born Hugh Allen Trimble in Augusta County, Virginia to James Trimble, Revolutionary War veteran, and Jane Allen Trimble. He was of Ulster Scots ancestry. In October 1784, his father moved his family to a veterans land grant in then Fayette County, Kentucky. In October 1804, James Trimble died leaving Allen head of the family. Allen Trimble moved them to a homestead he and his father had established outside of Hillsboro, Ohio.

Career
Trimble was a clerk of the Common Pleas Court in 1808. He also served as recorder of deeds in 1808.

After briefly serving during the War of 1812, Trimble served in the Ohio House of Representatives from 1816 to 1817 and then in the Ohio State Senate from 1818 to 1826. Trimble became Speaker of the Senate, and it was in this capacity that he became governor from January to December 1822 when Governor Ethan Allen Brown resigned to take a seat in the United States Senate.

Trimble ran an election for a full term in 1822, but narrowly lost. He challenged Jeremiah Morrow again in 1824, narrowing the distance between the two, but still losing. He won a landslide election in 1826, however, as a National Republican and then won a second full term in 1828. Trimble did not seek re-election in 1830. 

He then retired to farming, taking little part in politics for the next quarter-century, but did consent to accepting the nomination of the Know-Nothings for governor in 1855. Trimble came in third, losing to Republican US Senator Salmon Chase and incumbent Democrat William Medill. In 1860 he was a delegate to the Constitutional Union Party convention in Baltimore.

Death
Trimble died at his family farm in Ohio, and was buried in Hillsboro Cemetery in Hillsboro, Ohio.

Legacy
Trimble, Ohio, a village in Athens County, Ohio, is named in Trimble's honor. Court Street, a street in Hillsboro, Ohio, on the north side of the Highland County Courthouse, was renamed "Governor Trimble Place" in 1974.

Trimble's daughter, Eliza, helped to initiate the temperance movement in the United States.

Trimble is an ancestor of astronomer Virginia Louise Trimble

References

External links

National Governors Association
Ohio Memory

1783 births
1870 deaths
Governors of Ohio
Presidents of the Ohio State Senate
Members of the Ohio House of Representatives
Ohio Democratic-Republicans
Ohio Constitutional Unionists
People from Hillsboro, Ohio
Democratic-Republican Party state governors of the United States
Ohio National Republicans
Ohio Know Nothings
19th-century American politicians